Operation Kenova is a criminal investigation into whether the Royal Ulster Constabulary in Northern Ireland failed to investigate as many as 18 murders in order to protect a high level double agent codenamed Stakeknife working for the Force Research Unit inside the Provisional Irish Republican Army. The investigation is headed by Jon Boutcher, former Chief constable of Bedfordshire Police.

Stakeknife led the IRA Internal Security Unit, known as the "nutting squad". About 30 people were killed by the nutting squad while he was involved with it. Senior British officers referred to Stakeknife as the "golden egg" due to the calibre of information he supplied.

Research by Panorama suggested that Stakeknife was so highly prized that other agents were sacrificed to conceal his identity. Panorama claimed that Joseph Fenton was executed by the IRA despite Stakeknife telling his handlers that Fenton was to be killed. The authorities did nothing to prevent the murder.

In July 2020 Jon Boutcher expressed concern with the British Government's idea to close most legacy investigations and provide full investigations into only a few. He questioned whether the plan complied with the law.

Investigators working in Operation Kenova announced that they had obtained new DNA evidence relating to the murder of Thomas Oliver.

References

External links
Operation Kenova website

Criminal investigation
The Troubles (Northern Ireland)
British spies